The Informant! is a 2009 American biographical-crime comedy film directed by Steven Soderbergh. Written by Scott Z. Burns, the film stars Matt Damon as the titular informant named Mark Whitacre, as well as Scott Bakula, Joel McHale and Melanie Lynskey. It depicts Whitacre's involvement as a whistleblower in the lysine price-fixing conspiracy of the mid-1990s, based on the 2000 nonfiction book The Informant, by journalist Kurt Eichenwald.

Released on September 18, 2009, The Informant! received generally positive reviews from critics, with praise for Matt Damon's performance, although the film's comedic yet ironic tone received mixed reviews. The film was a commercial success, grossing $41.8 million on a $22 million budget.

Plot
Mark Whitacre, a rising star at the Archer Daniels Midland (ADM) office in Decatur, Illinois, during the early 1990s, blows the whistle on the company’s price-fixing tactics at the urging of his wife Ginger.

One night in November 1992, Whitacre confesses to FBI special agent Brian Shepard that ADM executives—including Whitacre himself—had routinely met with competitors to fix the price of lysine, an additive used in the commercial livestock industry. Whitacre secretly gathers hundreds of hours of video and audio over several years to present to the FBI. He assists in gathering evidence by clandestinely taping the company’s activity in business meetings at various locations around the globe such as Tokyo, Paris, Mexico City, and Hong Kong, eventually collecting enough evidence of collaboration and conspiracy to warrant a raid of ADM.

Whitacre’s good deed dovetails with his own major infractions, while his internal, secret struggle with bipolar disorder seems to take over his exploits. The bulk of the film focuses on Whitacre's meltdown resulting from the pressures of wearing a wire and organizing surveillance for the FBI for three years, instigated by Whitacre's reaction, in increasingly manic overlays, to various trivial magazine articles he reads. In a stunning turn of events immediately following the covert portion of the case, headlines around the world report Whitacre had embezzled $9 million from his own company during the same period of time he was secretly working with the FBI and taping his co-workers, while simultaneously aiming to be elected as ADM CEO following the arrest and conviction of the remaining upper management members. In the ensuing chaos, Whitacre appears to shift his trust and randomly destabilize his relationships with Special Agents Shepard and Herndon and numerous attorneys in the process.

Authorities at ADM begin investigating the forged papertrail Whitacre had built to cover his own deeds. After being confronted with evidence of his fraud, Whitacre's defensive claims begin to spiral out of control, including an accusation of assault and battery against Agent Shepard and the FBI, which had made a substantial move to distance their case from Whitacre entirely. Because of this major infraction and Whitacre’s bizarre behavior, he is sentenced to a prison term three times as long as that meted out to the white-collar criminals he helped to catch. In the epilogue, Agent Herndon visits Whitacre in prison as he videotapes a futile appeal to seek a presidential pardon. Overweight, balding and psychologically beaten after his years long ordeal, Whitacre is eventually released from prison, with Ginger waiting to greet him.

Cast
 Matt Damon as Mark Whitacre, Archer Daniels Midland executive
 Scott Bakula as FBI Special Agent Brian Shepard
 Joel McHale as FBI Special Agent Robert Herndon
 Melanie Lynskey as Ginger Whitacre
 Ann Cusack as Robin Mann
 Ann Dowd as FBI Special Agent Kate Medford
 Thomas F. Wilson as Mark Cheviron
 Tom Papa as Mick Andreas
 Rick Overton as Terry Wilson
 Allan Havey as FBI Supervisor Dean Paisley
 Patton Oswalt as Ed Herbst
 Craig Ricci Shaynak as Discouraged Foreman
 Scott Adsit as Sid Hulse
 Eddie Jemison as Kirk Schmidt
 Clancy Brown as Aubrey Daniel, ADM attorney
 Arden Myrin as Sarah Scott
 Tony Hale as James Epstein, Whitacre's attorney
 Andy Daly as Marty Allison, ADM vice-president
 Frank Welker as Mr. Whitacre
 Candy Clark as Mrs. Whitacre
 Dick Smothers as Judge Harold Baker
 Tom Smothers as Dwayne Andreas
 Richard Steven Horvitz as Bob Zaiderman
 Bob Zany as John Dowd, attorney
 Paul F. Tompkins as FBI Agent Anthony D'Angelo
 Lucas McHugh Carroll as Alexander Whitacre

Production
In 2002, after completing Ocean's Eleven, Soderbergh announced his intent to adapt the book The Informant by Kurt Eichenwald, a former journalist for The New York Times. Scott Z. Burns wrote the script based on the book.

Production began in May 2008 in Decatur, Illinois.  Filming was also done at the former Whitacre mansion in Moweaqua, Illinois, a small town about 25 miles from Decatur, and at Illini Country Club in Springfield, Illinois.  Some exterior shots were done in Mesa, Arizona, in November 2008. Other portions of the film were shot in the Coachella Valley, California. The film was released on September 18, 2009. Damon gained 20–30 pounds for the role in order to look more like Whitacre.

For the film Soderbergh cast a number of stand up comedians in prominent and supporting roles, including Andrew Daly, Joel McHale, Allan Havey, Tom Papa, Patton Oswalt, Rick Overton, Paul F. Tompkins, the Smothers Brothers and Bob Zany.

Release
The film was released on September 18, 2009 in the United States.

Box office
The film opened at #2 behind Cloudy with a Chance of Meatballs with $10,545,000. As of December 17, 2009, the film had grossed $33,316,821 domestically and $41,771,168 worldwide.

In the United Kingdom, the film opened at #10 with £179,612 from the opening weekend. It was the third highest new entry after A Serious Man and The Twilight Saga: New Moon.

Critical response
Rotten Tomatoes reported a 79% approval rating, based on 230 reviews with an average score of 6.8/10. The site's critics consensus states: "A charismatic turn by star Matt Damon and a consistently ironic tone boost this quietly funny satire about a corporate whistle-blower." On Metacritic, it has a weighted average score of 66 out of 100 based on reviews from 37 critics, indicating "generally favorable reviews". Audiences polled by CinemaScore gave the film an average grade of "C−" on an A+ to F scale.

Roger Ebert awarded the film four out of four stars, claiming "The Informant! is fascinating in the way it reveals two levels of events, not always visible to each other or to the audience."  

While giving the film the grade of a B, Entertainment Weekly noted that "Soderbergh has chosen to apply an attitude of arch whoopee, a greasy veneer of mirth over what is, no joke, a serious mess of malfeasance and mental instability," concluding, "Soderbergh ultimately made the choice to abandon interesting, dispassionate empathy for the more quick-fix payoff of amusement."

Peter Travers of Rolling Stone gave the film three-and-a-half out of four stars, and, in response to critics of the film's comic tone, commented, "Laugh you will at The Informant!, but it's way too real to laugh off." Leah Rozen of People magazine gave the film three-and-a-half out of four stars, saying, "[Damon]'s a hoot, and so is the movie." 

Todd McCarthy of Variety also praised Damon's performance, calling his interpretation of Whitacre, "The wacky little brother of Erin Brockovich" (whose life was also adapted by Soderbergh into a film).

Accolades
The film received nominations for multiple awards, including a Satellite Award for Best Actor in a Motion Picture – Musical or Comedy for Matt Damon as well as a nomination from the Detroit Film Critics Society. Damon was also nominated for the Golden Globe Award for Best Performance by an Actor in a Motion Picture – Musical or Comedy.

See also
 Lysine price-fixing conspiracy

References

External links
 
 
 
 
 This American Life #168: The Fix Is In – interview with Mark Whitacre and the book's author, Kurt Eichenwald, from This American Life

2009 comedy films
2009 films
2000s crime comedy films
American business films
American crime comedy films
Archer Daniels Midland
Biographical films about businesspeople
Crime films based on actual events
Films about bipolar disorder
Films about security and surveillance
Films based on non-fiction books
Films directed by Steven Soderbergh
Films produced by Gregory Jacobs
Films scored by Marvin Hamlisch
Films set in Illinois
Films set in Missouri
Films set in 1992
Films set in the 1990s
Films shot in Arizona
Films shot in Illinois
Films shot in France
Films shot in Hawaii
Films shot in Missouri
Films with screenplays by Scott Z. Burns
Films shot in Switzerland
Participant (company) films
This American Life
Warner Bros. films
2000s English-language films
2000s American films